Voisey's Bay Aerodrome  is located adjacent to Voisey's Bay Mine, Newfoundland and Labrador, Canada.

PAL Airlines provides daily scheduled charter service to Voisey's Bay using Dash 8s and Twin Otters. PAL also has dispatch located on the field which also provides weather, airport and traffic advisory services to aircraft using the airstrip. Canadian Helicopters is located on site.

Airlines and destinations

References

Registered aerodromes in Newfoundland and Labrador